Cawsand (lit. Cow Cove) and Kingsand (Cornish: Porthruw) are twin villages in southeast Cornwall, England, United Kingdom. The village is situated on the Rame Peninsula and is in the parish of Maker-with-Rame.

Cawsand overlooks Plymouth Sound and adjoins Kingsand, formerly on the border of Devon and Cornwall (the border has since been moved and now is situated on the River Tamar). Cawsand has two public houses: the Cross Keys Inn on Armada Road, not trading and for sale in September 2022, and the Bay bar, overlooking Cawsand beach.

Cawsand is within Mount Edgcumbe Country Park. There are frequent bus services to the city of Plymouth which is three miles to the north across Plymouth Sound.   There is also a ferry service in the summer (from Cawsand Bay to Plymouth Hoe) and a pilot gig club (Rame Gig Club).

The Rame Peninsula is considered part of the Forgotten Corner of Cornwall.

Geology 
Cawsand Beach is sand and shingle with a network of rockpools and is found along The Bound.

History
In 1596, local militia repelled an attack by Spanish forces and defences were built soon after. Cawsand Fort (at ) is sited just above the village. The fort is an 1860s Royal Commission on the Defence of the United Kingdom fort built on the site of a 1779 battery to mount about 10 guns to cover the western entrance to Plymouth Sound by the breakwater. Released by the Ministry of Defence in 1926, it remained derelict until it was converted into residential accommodation.

Correspondence from 1801 to 1803 shows that Admiral Nelson had stayed in Cawsand and it is rumoured that he had dined at the Ship Inn, which burned down in 2013 after several years of abandonment. The site has been cleared and is now being rebuilt by The Peninsula Trust which plans to turn the site into a cafe and affordable housing.

Religion 
St Andrew's Church was built as a chapel of ease in 1877–78. It is a Grade II listed building.

Originally built in 1793, Cawsand also has a Congregational Church.

Twinning

Cawsand is twinned with Porspoder in Brittany, France.

References

External links

Victorian Forts data sheet on Cawsand Bay Battery
Rame Heritage

Villages in Cornwall
Military history of Cornwall
Forts of Plymouth, Devon
Buildings and structures in Cornwall
Forts in Cornwall